General elections were held in Guatemala on 3 March 1974. The ruling Institutional Democratic Party's presidential candidate was General Kjell Eugenio Laugerud García, an army officer whose running mate was Mario Sandoval Alarcón, the long-time leader of the far-right National Liberation Movement.  The National Opposition Front's candidate was also an army officer, General Efraín Ríos Montt, whose running mate was economist Alberto Fuentes Mohr.  The National Opposition Front was a coalition of the Guatemalan Christian Democracy, Fuentes's Social Democratic Party, and the Authentic Revolutionary Party.

After the National Opposition Front led the first counts on election night, the government stopped releasing further updates and several days later declared that Laugerud had won by about 71,000 votes.  According to many independent observers, this result was fraudulent, and Ríos had actually received a clear majority of the votes.  Since none of the presidential candidates were reported as having obtaining more than 50% of the popular vote, the election was ultimately decided by the government-controlled National Congress, which chose Laugerud by a vote of 38 to 2, with 15 opposition deputies abstaining.

Soon after the election, General Ríos was posted as military attaché to Guatemala's embassy in Madrid.  The Congressional elections were also won by the alliance of Laugerud's Institutional Democratic Party and Sandoval's National Liberation Movement.

Results

President

Congress

References

Bibliography
Guía del organismo legislativo República de Guatemala. Preparada por el Instituto Nacional de Administración para el Desarrollo, Dobierno de la República. 1968. 
Villagrán Kramer, Francisco. Biografía política de Guatemala: años de guerra y años de paz. FLACSO-Guatemala, 2004. 
Political handbook of the world 1974. New York, 1975.

Elections in Guatemala
1974 in Guatemala
Guatemala
Presidential elections in Guatemala
Election and referendum articles with incomplete results